Secure64 Software Corporation is a software development company headquartered in Fort Collins, CO, USA, building server applications.

History 
Secure64 was founded in 2002 and began full-scale development in 2005. Its founders include Bill Worley, CTO, a former chief scientist of Hewlett Packard and lead developer of PA-RISC and PA-WideWord technologies. Secure64 has filed for several patents.

Technology

SourceT Micro OS 
The SourceT Micro OS executes on standard Itanium server hardware, and provides the foundation for Secure64 software applications. Secure64 uses the term "micro OS" to describe SourceT, because, although it shares attributes of traditional microkernels and monolithic kernels, it does not fit the classical definition of either.

Like microkernels, SourceT adheres to the principles that minimal code should execute in kernel mode (currently less than 4,000 lines of code in SourceT), and that all applications and operating system services such as File system, device drivers and protocol stacks should not execute in kernel mode. However, like monolithic kernel architectures, SourceT's operating system services are accessed through system service calls rather than through interprocess communication with user-mode servers.

Unlike general-purpose operating systems, which are designed to execute on a wide variety of hardware platforms, SourceT was specifically designed to take advantage of some of the unique security and performance features of the Itanium microprocessor to create a high performance, highly secure architecture. These unique Itanium features include:

Completely independent read/write/execute privileges on memory pages
Hardware controlled memory compartments with protection IDs
Separation of control information from data on system stacks
Inability to execute code from system stacks
High performance from instruction-level parallelism

Self-Protecting Network Stack 

Secure64 has a patent pending for the queued, non-blocking and self-protecting communications architecture used by SourceT. Designed from the ground up with a queued, scalable architecture that differs significantly from a traditional Berkeley sockets architecture, the network stack accelerates network I/O performance and automatically detects and drops malformed or flooding packets, such as those received as the victim of  a Denial-of-service attacks.

Products 
Secure64 DNS products are security-hardened commercial DNS appliances, deployed on a proprietary 64-bit operating system running on Intel Itanium hardware. Some of these products include:

 Authoritative DNS server, Secure64 DNS Authority

 Caching DNS server, Secure64 DNS Cache

 DNS Network Management, Secure64 DNS Manager

 DNSSEC, Secure64 DNS Signer

 DNS-based Network Security, Secure64 DNS Guard

References

See also 
 Comparison of DNS server software

Software companies established in 2002
Software companies based in Colorado
Companies based in Fort Collins, Colorado
Server appliance
DNS software
Software companies of the United States